Colpostoma is a genus of beetles in the family Carabidae, containing the following species:

 Colpostoma avinovi Semenov & Znojko, 1929 
 Colpostoma centrasiaticum Semenov & Znojko, 1929 
 Colpostoma darvazicum Mikhailov, 1976 
 Colpostoma insigne Semenov, 1889 
 Colpostoma petri Semenov & Znojko, 1929 
 Colpostoma tschitscherini Semenov & Znojko, 1929 
 Colpostoma turkestanicum Jedlicka, 1960

References

Licininae